Kijkuit is a railway station in the town of Kalmthout, Antwerp, Belgium. The station opened on 15 May 1933 on the Antwerp–Lage Zwaluwe railway, known in Belgium as Line 12.

Train services
The station is served by the following services:

Local services (L-22) Roosendaal - Essen - Antwerp - Puurs (weekdays)
Local services (L-22) Roosendaal - Essen - Antwerp (weekends)

External links
belgianrail.be

Railway stations opened in 1933
Railway stations in Belgium
Railway stations in Antwerp Province
Kalmthout